Sweeden is an unincorporated community in north-central Edmonson County, Kentucky, United States. The population of Sweeden's ZCTA was 171 at the 2000 census. It is part of the Bowling Green, Kentucky Metropolitan Statistical Area.  The ZIP Code for Sweeden is 42285.

Geography

It is bordered to the south by Lindseyville, to the north by Bee Spring, and to the east by Nolin Lake. It is one of the many communities in Edmonson County that borders Mammoth Cave National Park.

Education
Kyrock Elementary School, one of the five schools of the Edmonson County School System, is located just north of Sweeden.

Transportation
KY 259 runs through the middle of the town.

References

External links
Kyrock Elementary School Homepage

Unincorporated communities in Kentucky
Unincorporated communities in Edmonson County, Kentucky
Bowling Green metropolitan area, Kentucky